Elmi Ahmed Duale (born 1935;) is a Somali physician, diplomat and politician.

Biography
Duale was born in Bulo-Burte (Hiran), Somalia in 1935. He graduated from the Sapienza University of Rome in 1960 with a Doctor of Medicine. From 1963 to 1968, he served as Director General of Somalia's Ministry of Health.

In 1969, Duale was elected to the Parliament of Somalia, and was selected as Foreign Minister in this government. From 1970 to 1973, he and the other members of the Cabinet were imprisoned by Siad Barre after Barre assumed power following a coup d'état.

In 1974, Duale joined the World Health Organization (WHO), where he worked for 30 years. He has been the WHO Team Leader of the Programme Coordinator for Nigeria, the WHO Representative for Tanzania and Eritrea, and the WHO Public Health Consultant in Dar es Salaam.

In 2005, he became the Permanent Representative of Somalia to the United Nations in New York City and held the position for 11 years until late 2016.

Footnotes

References
"New Permanent Representative of Somalia Presents Credentials", UN Press Release, UN Doc. BIO/3707, 18 October 2005

Living people
Somalian diplomats
20th-century Somalian physicians
Permanent Representatives of Somalia to the United Nations
Somalian prisoners and detainees
Prisoners and detainees of Somalia
World Health Organization officials
Sapienza University of Rome alumni
Government ministers of Somalia
Ethnic Somali people
1935 births
Somalian officials of the United Nations